FC St. Veit was an Austria n association football club from Sankt Veit an der Glan, Carinthia. It was founded in 1989 as a merger of two local clubs, SV St. Veit/Glan, founded in 1950, and SC Amateure St. Veit/Glan, founded in 1966. It played in the Sixth Division, and in 2014 the team was renamed FC Alpe Adria until 2016 when it disbanded its senior team.

History
FC St. Veit was established on the foundations of its two predecessor clubs, both traditional Carinthian clubs: the SCA St. Veit (SC Amateure St. Veit) was founded as ATUS St. Veit and as an all-round club shortly after the end of the Second World War and the SV St. Veit was founded in 1950 and was promoted to the second-rate Tauernliga in 1953 as the Carinthian champions.They won promotion to the now third tier Regionalliga Mitte in 1973.

In 1974, SV St. Veit/Glan won promotion to the second division after the promotion/relegation playoffs against SK Vorwärts Steyr and WSV Liezen. The club played city rivals SC Amateure St. Veit/Glan, who had been promoted to the 2nd division just one year after SV St. Veit/Glan, in the following five seasons. In 1977, SV St. Veit/Glan managed to reach the semi-finals of the ÖFB Cup as a second division team, where they lost 2-1 to Wiener Sport-Club. They repeated this success in 1980, losing to SV Austria Salzburg this time around.

Bundesliga
While SCA St. Veit were relegated to the Landesliga in 1980/81, SV St. Veit/Glan won promotion to the Bundesliga alongside Favoritner AC Wien after the 1982/83 season. They also won their debut top tier game in 1983/84 against SK VÖEST Linz 2-0 and drew the next game against SSW Innsbruck. They ended the season in 14th place but lost in the relegation play-offs (held due to the disbandment of Union Wels) to DSV Alpine. The relegation meant a decisive turning point in the history of the club and as early as the 1986/87 season, SV St. Veit/Glan finished bottom in the lower league play-offs and were relegated to the Landesliga.

Merger
SV St. Veit/Glan ended the 1988/89 season in the middle of the table in the Kärntner Liga, while the SCA was bottom of the Unterliga East. As a result, the two clubs finally merged.. There was a sporting low point in 1992/93, when the club, now known as FC St. Veit, had to be relegated to the Unterliga Ost. Between 1998 and 2003 the merger club played in the new Regionalliga Mitte and later in the Landesliga. On June 30, 2005, the Jacques Lemans Arena was opened as the new home stadium.

In the 2005/06 season, FC St. Veit narrowly missed out on winning the Kärntner Liga against FC Kärnten/Welzenegg, but two years later they secured the championship to the Regionalliga Mitte once more and stayed there for two years between 2008 and 2010 before falling back into the Kärntner Liga again.

FC Alpe Adria and bankruptcy
On June 22, 2014, the club's general meeting decided to change the name to FC Alpe Adria in order to initiate a cultural component with the northern Italian region. In the 2014/15 season, the club suffered a sporting defeat because it was relegated to the Unterliga. After the 2015/16 championship, the club withdraw from the league due to a lack of players and money. From the 2017/18 season, FC St. Veit restarted in the 2. Klasse (D region) and it was practically the first time in the history of the club that emerged from SV St. Veit that they played in the lowest division in the post-war period. The name FC Alpe Adria had been dropped by now. On June 4th. In 2018 the club was deemed bankrupt.

A new club, SC St. Veit was founded in 2018 and as of the 2022/23 season they play in the 5th-tier Unterliga Ost.

References

Bibliography

Association football clubs established in 1966
Association football clubs disestablished in 2016
Sankt Veit, FC
1966 establishments in Austria
2016 disestablishments in Austria